Andrew Swift is an Australian country music singer and songwriter. In 2017, Swift was a finalist in the Toyota Starmaker. Swift won two awards at the 2019 Golden guitar awards at the Country Music Awards of Australia.

Career
Swift began playing in a band called Race the Frey, which was a Melbourne indie/pop-punk band.  He later fronted, Andrew Swift & The Rattlesnake Choir.

In 2015, Swift self-released his pop-rock solo self-titled album.

In January 2017, Swift was named a grand finalist in the Toyota Starmaker competition.

In 2017, Swift signed to indie label Social Family Records and released the album Call Out for the Cavalry in March 2018, which hit number one on the ARIA Country Albums Chart.

At the 2019 Country Music Awards of Australia, Swift won Qantas New Talent of the Year and Alternative Country Album of the Year.

In November 2019, Swift was named the official Ambassador for the iconic Dog on the Tuckerbox at Gundagai.

In June 2020, he signed to ABC Music. The first single under the new label agreement was "Never Meant to Break Your Heart", released in June 2020.

In March 2021, Swift announced his third studio album The Art of Letting Go, which was released on 11 June 2021.

Swift was nominated for two 2022 Golden Guitar Awards - Male Artist of The Year and Alternative Country Album of The Year.

In February 2023, Swift announced the forthcoming release of his fourth studio album, Lightning Strikes and Neon Nights, set for release on 28 April 2023.

Discography

Studio albums

Awards

AIR Awards
The Australian Independent Record Awards (commonly known informally as AIR Awards) is an annual awards night to recognise, promote and celebrate the success of Australia's Independent Music sector.

! 
|-
| 2022
| The Art of Letting Go
| Best Independent Country Album or EP
| 
|

Country Music Awards of Australia
The Country Music Awards of Australia is an annual awards night held in January during the Tamworth Country Music Festival. Celebrating recording excellence in the Australian country music industry. They commenced in 1973.

! 
|-
| rowspan=4| 2019 || Call Out for the Cavalry || Alt. Country Album of the Year  ||  || rowspan=4| 
|-
| Andrew Swift || Qantas Best New Talent || 
|-
| Andrew Swift || Male Artist of the Year || 
|-
| "Fire & Ice" (with Catherine Britt) || Vocal Collaboration of the Year || 
|-
| 2020 || "Second Hand"  (with Gretta Ziller) || Vocal Collaboration of the Year  ||  || 
|-
| rowspan=2| 2022 || Andrew Swift || Male Artist of the Year ||  || rowspan=2| 
|-
| The Art of Letting Go || Alternative Country Album of The Year ||  
|-
| 2023 || Andrew Swift || Male Artist of the Year ||  ||
|-

References

Australian country singers
Australian male singers
Living people
Year of birth missing (living people)